This is a list of films in which the theme of class struggle is a prominent element.

See also

List of films about revolution
List of films featuring colonialism
List of films featuring slavery

References

Films about social class
Class struggle